Wivenhoe Hill is a locality in the Somerset Region, Queensland, Australia.

Geography 
The locality is beside Lake Wivenhoe, the impoundment created by the Wivenhoe Dam over the Brisbane River. As the name suggests, the locality is hilly with three named peaks: Wivenhoe Hill , Pine Hill  and Wash Pool Knoll . Although the locality is very close to the lake, the shoreline of the lake and the lake itself are within the locality of Lake Wivenhoe.

The Brisbane Valley Highway passes from the very south-east of the locality to the south-west (Coominya). There are only a few roads in the locality; Logan Inlet Road provides access down to the lake shores for camping and recreational use.

The principal land use in the locality is cattle grazing.

History 
The locality takes its name from the hill which in turn was named after a pastoral station operated by Edmund Blucher Uhr circa 1844, which in turn was named after Wivenhoe, a village in Essex, England. The hill is also called Bigges Hill after pastoralist and politician Francis Edward Bigge who operated the Mount Brisbane pastoral run in the district.

The Wivenhoe pastoral station was historically beside the Brisbane River, but after the construction of Wivenhoe Dam across the river (opened 1984), the locality is now adjacent to Lake Wivenhoe.

Attractions 
The Logan Inlet day-use area offers swimming, boating, fishing and picnic facilities. There are two campsites: Captain Logan camp ground and Lumley Hill camp ground.

Education 
There are no school in Wivenhoe Hill. There are primary schools in neighbouring Coominya and Patrick Estate.

References 

Suburbs of Somerset Region
Localities in Queensland